Ashok Kumar (born 1 June 1950) is an Indian former professional field hockey player. He is the son of the Indian hockey player Dhyan Chand. Kumar was known for his exceptional skills and ball control. He was a member of the Indian team that won the 1975 World Cup.

He was awarded the Arjuna Award in 1974 and, in 1975, scored the winning goal against Pakistan to achieve India's only win in the World Cup. He was awarded with Yash Bharati by the Government of Uttar Pradesh in the 2013.

Career
Ashok Kumar played for Rajasthan University in 1966-67 and All India Universities in 1968-69. Thereafter, he moved to Calcutta to play for Mohun Bagan Club and represented Bengal in the National Championships in Bangalore in 1971. He later joined Indian Airlines and represented it in national tournaments. He made his international debut in 1970 when he was included in the team for the Asian Games in Bangkok, losing the title to Pakistan. He also took part in the 1974 and 1978 Asian Games held at Tehran and Bangkok respectively, winning silver medals in those two games.

Kumar represented India in the Olympic Games twice, in 1972 in Munich and in 1976 in Montreal. In 1972, India finished third and, in 1976, India finished seventh, the first time since 1928 that India was not in top three. He played at the Pesta Sukha International Tournament in Singapore in 1971 and captained the team to the 1979 Esanda Hockey Tournament in Perth, Western Australia. He played for the All-Asian star team, where his father Dhyan Chand watched him play for the first time in 1974, and was selected twice for the World XI team.

At the World Cup
He was a member of the team that won the bronze medal at the first World Cup in Barcelona in 1971 and silver at the second World Cup in Amsterdam in 1973. The highlight of his career was the 1975 Hockey World Cup in Kuala Lumpur where he scored an important goal in the final match for India against Pakistan. On a pass from Surjit Singh, Kumar hit the ball goalwards. The ball hit the corner of the post and bounced out, but for a fraction of a second the ball had been in the goal and, despite protests by Pakistan, the Malaysian umpire confirmed the goal. His fourth and final appearance in the World Cup was in the 1978 World Cup in Argentina when India was relegated to sixth position.

On retirement from active sports, he was appointed manager of the hockey teams of Indian Airlines and Air India.

References

External links
 Profile at sportal.nic.in
 

1950 births
Living people
Sportspeople from Meerut
People from Jhansi
Olympic field hockey players of India
Field hockey players at the 1972 Summer Olympics
Field hockey players at the 1976 Summer Olympics
Indian male field hockey players
Recipients of the Arjuna Award
University of Rajasthan alumni
Olympic medalists in field hockey
Olympic bronze medalists for India
Asian Games medalists in field hockey
Field hockey players at the 1970 Asian Games
Field hockey players at the 1974 Asian Games
Field hockey players at the 1978 Asian Games
Field hockey players from Uttar Pradesh
Medalists at the 1972 Summer Olympics
Asian Games silver medalists for India
Medalists at the 1970 Asian Games
Medalists at the 1974 Asian Games
Medalists at the 1978 Asian Games
1978 Men's Hockey World Cup players
1990 Men's Hockey World Cup players